Theresa Gavarone (born June 30, 1966) is an American attorney, politician, and businesswoman serving as a member of the Ohio Senate for the 2nd district. A Republican, Gavarone was first appointed to the Senate in 2019 after serving in the Ohio House of Representatives from 2016 to 2019.

Early life and career
Gavarone was born in Dayton, Ohio and attended Archbishop Alter High School in neighboring Kettering. She earned a Bachelor of Science degree in business administration from Bowling Green State University and a Juris Doctor from the University of Toledo College of Law, graduating in 1994. Soon after, she began practicing law in Bowling Green.

Along with her husband Jim, Gavarone owns and operates Mr. Spots Philadelphia Steak Sandwich in Bowling Green along with practicing law. Gavarone was elected to two full terms on the Bowling Green City Council, winning in 2013 and again in 2015.

Political career

Ohio House of Representatives 
In 2016, Tim Brown decided to step down from the Ohio House to take a position with the Toledo Metropolitan Area Council of Governments, allowing Speaker Cliff Rosenberger and the House Republican Caucus to select his successor. After vetting, Gavarone was chosen to complete the remainder of Brown's term and to take his place on the ballot for a full term beginning in 2017. She was seated in the House on August 2, 2016, and won elections for full terms in 2016 and again in 2018.

Gavarone was vice chair of the House Health Committee.

Ohio Senate 
In 2019, Randy Gardner was appointed by Governor Mike DeWine as chancellor of the Ohio Department of Higher Education. He resigned from the Senate in January. Gavarone immediately announced her intention to seek an appointment to the seat. On February 6, after unanimous approval by the Senate Republican Caucus, Gavarone was officially sworn in as a member of the Senate.

At the beginning of the 133rd General Assembly, Gavarone became vice chair of the Senate Higher Education Committee.

In June 2019, Gavarone sponsored legislation that would ban synthetic urine. In 2021, after Democratic candidates had won several races for the Supreme Court of Ohio in a row, Gavarone proposed a bill that would list the party affiliation of state supreme court judicial candidates on ballots.

Committee assignments 
During the 134th General Assembly, Gavarone was assigned to the following Ohio Senate committees:

 (Chair of) Local Government and Elections Committee
 (Vice Chair of) Finance Committee
 Judiciary Committee
 Small Business & Economic Opportunity Committee
 Rules & Reference Committee

Additionally, Gavarone had the following special appointments:

 (Chair of) Joint Committee on Agency Rule Review
 (Vice Chair of) Ohio Ballot Board
 Joint Legislative Committee on Adoption Promotion and Support
 Ohio Child Support Guideline Advisory Council
 Great Lakes Commission
 National Council of State Legislatures Redistricting & Election Committee

2022 congressional election 
Gavarone was a Republican candidate for Ohio's 9th congressional district in the 2022 election. She placed third in the May 3, 2022, Ohio primary, losing to J.R. Majewski, a nuclear power plant employee who came to prominence after painting a Trump sign on his lawn.

Personal life 
Gavarone and her husband have three children.

Electoral history

References 

1966 births
21st-century American politicians
21st-century American women politicians
Bowling Green State University alumni
Businesspeople from Dayton, Ohio
Candidates in the 2022 United States House of Representatives elections
Living people
Republican Party members of the Ohio House of Representatives
Republican Party Ohio state senators
People from Bowling Green, Ohio
Politicians from Dayton, Ohio
People from Kettering, Ohio
University of Toledo College of Law alumni
Women state legislators in Ohio